Peter Griffin's Guide to the Holidays is an American humor book about Family Guy written by executive producer Danny Smith. The book was first published on 23 October 2007. The book consists of a monologue by Peter Griffin discussing his various memories of Christmas and other subjects related to the holiday. Though the book primarily consists of a loose narrative monologue related to Christmas, it is also interspersed with sections from other cast members such as Quagmire.

It was published in the United Kingdom in 2008 by Orion Books.

Book description

From the Griffin house to yours—a one-of-a-kind guide to enjoying the most wonderful freakin' time of the year!

Peter Griffin, everyman extraordinaire, the holidays are the best time of year. With endless Christmas specials (a couch potato's dream!), plenty of family merriment, and eggnog that's heavy on the booze, what's not to like? In this unique Yuletide treasure, the Fat Man offers up a host of holiday memories from the Griffin household as well as hilarious tips for merrymaking the Family Guy way.

From Peter's childhood Christmas recollections (he never let a burned cookie go to waste) to a tour of Quahog at Christmastime (warning: don't look in Quagmire's stocking), to the Griffin family's most sacred holiday traditions, this book has something for everyone on your holiday list, regardless of whether they've been naughty or nice.

References

2007 books
Family Guy publications
Comedy books
Christmas books
Works about dysfunctional families
HarperCollins books